Cryptopine is an opium alkaloid. It is found in plants in the family Papaveraceae, including Argemone mexicana.

See also 
 Protopine
 Allocryptopine

References

Natural opium alkaloids
Alkaloids found in Papaveraceae
Benzodioxoles
Alkaloids